The 2006–07 Alabama Crimson Tide men's basketball team (variously "Alabama", "UA", "Bama" or "The Tide") represented the University of Alabama in the 2006–07 college basketball season. The head coach was Mark Gottfried, who was in his ninth season as Alabama. The team played its home games at Coleman Coliseum in Tuscaloosa, Alabama and was a member of the Southeastern Conference. This was the 94th season of basketball in the school's history. The Crimson Tide finished the season 20–12, 7–9 in SEC play, lost in the first round of the 2007 SEC men's basketball tournament. They were invited to the 2007 National Invitation Tournament and lost in the first round.

Schedule and results

|-
!colspan=12 style=|Non-conference regular season

|-
!colspan=12 style=|SEC regular season

|-
!colspan=12 style=| SEC tournament

|-
!colspan=12 style="background:#990000; color:#FFFFFF;"| National Invitation tournament

See also
2007 NCAA Men's Division I Basketball Tournament
2006–07 NCAA Division I men's basketball season
2006–07 NCAA Division I men's basketball rankings

References

Alabama
Alabama Crimson Tide men's basketball seasons
2006 in sports in Alabama
Alabama Crimson Tide